Justin Paul (born 17 November 1972) is a New Zealand former cricketer. He played eight first-class and twelve List A matches for Otago between 1992 and 1995.

See also
 List of Otago representative cricketers

References

External links
 

1972 births
Living people
New Zealand cricketers
Otago cricketers
Cricketers from Dunedin